Bartlett Inlet is a largely ice-filled inlet, about  wide, indenting the north coast of Edward VII Peninsula just east of Cape Colbeck. It was mapped from surveys by the United States Geological Survey and from U.S. Navy air photos (1959–65), and named by the Advisory Committee on Antarctic Names for Lieutenant Eugene F. Bartlett, MC, U.S. Navy, officer in charge at Byrd Station, 1960.

References 

Inlets of Antarctica
Bodies of water of the Ross Dependency
King Edward VII Land